Kenea Yadeta is an Ethiopian politician and former minister of the Ministry of Defense.

Biography 
Of ethnic Oromo descent. He studied administration and holds a PhD in Public Management, a Master's in Public & Constitutional Law, in Public Administration, and in Business Administration. He served in the Ethiopian Federal Police as Deputy Commissioner General, as Head of Security and Administration Bureau, and security chief of Oromia Region. On 18 August 2020, he was appointed by Ethiopian Prime Minister Abiy Ahmed as Minister of Defense amid a controversy between his predecessor and the prime minister. He became a key figure in the Tigray War. He was succeeded by Abraham Belay, former head of the Transitional Government of Tigray on 6 October 2021.

References 

Year of birth missing (living people)
Defence ministers of Ethiopia
People from Oromia Region
Living people
21st-century Ethiopian politicians